William Hayden Evans is an American professional soccer player who plays as a goalkeeper for Michigan Wolverines. He previously played for League Two club Salford City, where he made his professional debut and won his first trophy, the 2019–20 EFL Trophy

Career

Evans began his career at EFL League Two side Salford City and made his professional début on September 29, 2020, in the EFL Trophy against Morecambe. He started and played the full match as Salford City won 2–0.

Career statistics

Honours
Salford City
EFL Trophy: 2019–20

References

2002 births
Living people
American soccer players
Association football goalkeepers
Michigan Wolverines men's soccer players
Salford City F.C. players